Khondokar Mahmud Hasan (known as KM Hasan; born 27 January 1939) is a Bangladeshi diplomat and jurist who served as the 13th Chief Justice of Bangladesh.

Early life and education
Hasan's father Khandaker Mohammed Hasan was a justice. Hasan completed his BA, MA and LLB in Dhaka, LLM in London and is a Barrister-at-Law from Lincoln's Inn.

Career
Hasan enrolled as a Supreme Court advocate in 1963. He served as ambassador to Iraq during 1980–1982. He was elevated as a judge to the High Court in 1999 and the Appellate Division on 20 January 2002. Supreme Court Bar Association boycotted his appointment as the chief Justice.

See also
 2006–08 Bangladeshi political crisis

References

Living people
1939 births
Ambassadors of Bangladesh to Iraq
Supreme Court of Bangladesh justices
Chief justices of Bangladesh